The Chinese Taipei Olympic Committee (IOC code: TPE) is the National Olympic Committee representing the Republic of China (Taiwan).

History
The China National Amateur Athletic Federation was established on 3 April 1922. Later that year, the International Olympic Committee recognized the federation as the Chinese Olympic Committee. In 1924, Wang Cheng-ting, the president of the committee, was elected a member of the International Olympic Committee during the 22nd IOC Sessions, which were held in Paris, France.

The China National Amateur Athletic Federation was reorganized on 24 August 1924 in Shanghai; the name of the federation remained the same in English but not in Chinese. The federation attended the opening ceremony of the 1924 Summer Olympics in Paris, but did not attend the events; no athletes were sent to attend the 1928 Summer Olympics in Amsterdam. During the 1932 Summer Olympics, held in Los Angeles, the federation used the name "China" and only one athlete, Liu Changchun, competed in sprinting.

In the aftermath of the Chinese Civil War, nineteen of the twenty-six members of the federation left the mainland for Taiwan. The headquarters of the federation moved from Nanjing to Taipei City and, with the approval of the IOC, the federation was renamed the Chinese Olympic Committee, National Amateur Athletic Federation. The first Olympic medalist in the country's history was Taiwanese athlete Yang Chuan-kwang during the 1960 Summer Olympics.

The Organizing Committee for the 1952 Summer Olympics scheduled for Helsinki invited both the People's Republic of China and Republic of China attend the Games, as the IOC recognized both Olympic Committees, but the Chinese Olympic Committee withdrew from the games because its delegation was listed as "China (Formosa)". The federation was informed by the International Committee that, as it did not control sport in Mainland China, it could not continue to be recognized as "Chinese National Olympic Committee," and only applications under a different name would be considered. Moreover, the announcement stated: "IOC should not be involved in any political issue or views." The Executive Committee of the International Olympic Committee stated the National Olympic Committee should be considered its own local jurisdiction, but have jurisdiction over its governance. Therefore, the federation reorganized itself as the Republic of China Olympic Committee (ROCOC) on 1 January 1960, and this name was approved in the 1960s.

The ROC NOC agreed the delegation should be known as "Taiwan", but would be allowed to use the initials "ROC" their uniforms. Shortly after Taiwan's expulsion from the UN in 1971, the People's Republic of China implemented the "One China" policy, making it difficult for the island to be recognized in many fields, not just sports. For example, in 1971 the Canadian government announced it was not permitting members of ROCOC to attend the 1976 Summer Olympics as it recognized People's Republic of China as the sole legitimate government according to the One China Policy.

The federation held an annual Chinese Taipei Olympic Academy (CTOA) as the National Olympic Academy Session (NOA) each year in different counties of Taiwan since 1978, and the academy became the fourth National Olympic Committee, and was the first NOC in Asia to hold an Olympic Academy.

The United States Olympic Committee tried to solve the problem of the membership between ROCOC and Chinese Olympic Committee during the 81st IOC Session in Montevideo, Uruguay, as relations between Republic of China and the United States of America broke off in 1979. The ROCOC was forced to change the name of the committee and would no longer be allowed to use the national anthem and national flag of the Republic of China according to the results of a postal ballot (62:17) by the Executive Committee of the International Olympic Committee in Nagoya, Japan. Later on, the Swiss Court agreed the judicial review of the ROCOC and the Taiwanese IOC member Henry Hsu by the IOC violated the Olympic Charter. As a result, the IOC modified the Olympic Charter in 1980 which stated that Olympic delegations are recognized National Olympic Committees by the IOC and IOC members cannot sue the IOC following the judgement by the Swiss Court.

ROCOC was renamed as the Chinese Taipei Olympic Committee according to an approved agreement between the International Olympic Committee, in Lausanne, and the Chinese Taipei Olympic Committee, in Taipei signed by Shen Jia-ming (delegate of the committee) who presented it to the International Olympic Committee in Lausanne, Switzerland, on 23 March 1981, with the assistance of Juan Antonio Samaranch, the IOC president. The approved agreement allowed the delegation of the Chinese Taipei Olympic Committee to use Chinese Taipei for presenting themselves, and the emblem of the Chinese Taipei Olympic Committee and the Olympic flag of the Chinese Taipei as the delegation's symbol. Moreover, the Chinese Taipei team would continue using the letter T to determine alphabetical order in the IOC Directory. The committee competed for the first time under the new moniker at the Sarajevo Games.

It was only in 1989, that both the Olympic Committee of the People's Republic of China (CNOC) and the Olympic Committee of Chinese Taipei began to collaborate and exchange internationally. For this to happen a second agreement was signed on April 6 of that year. And within the stipulated conditions was the fact that the name "China Taipei" could not more used and any delegation or international organization from ROC had to use "Chinese Taipei" rather than "China Taipei" to participate. This agreement also allowed the entry of Chinese Taipei in virtually all world sports federations and guaranteed its participation in the 1990 Asian Games that were scheduled for Beijing.

Symbols 
The emblem of the Chinese Taipei Olympic Committee includes symbols of the Chinese Taipei Olympic Committee and the Chinese Taipei team. The periphery shape is plum blossom that symbolizes the National Flower of the Republic of China. It includes the Olympic rings and the Blue Sky with a White Sun (note that the Blue Sky with a White Sun is different from both the National Emblem of the Republic of China and the party emblem of the Kuomintang although it seems the same as the National Emblem of the Republic of China). For the Olympic flag of Chinese Taipei is the same as the emblem.

The National Flag Anthem of the Republic of China is used as the anthem of Chinese Taipei as the Anthem of the Chinese Taipei Olympic Committee but not the National Anthem of the Republic of China, after the Agreement signed in 1981 which was approved by the International Olympic Committee in June 1981. In addition, some parts of the lyrics were modified with the theory of Olympism when submitted for approval in 1981 but is not commonly used in Taiwan.

List of presidents
The following table lists all the presidents of the Olympic committee:

See also 
 Chinese Olympic Committee
 Sports Federation and Olympic Committee of Hong Kong, China
 Macau Sports and Olympic Committee
 Chinese Taipei
 Chinese Taipei at the Olympics
 Chinese Taipei Olympic flag

References

External links 
Chinese Taipei Olympic Committee

1922 establishments in Taiwan
Taiwan
Oly
Sports organizations established in 1922
Taiwan at the Olympics